Mary Naa Amanua Dodoo, also known as Naa Amanua, is a Ghanaian Ga folklore music singer and songwriter. She was the lead female singer for Wulomei, a Ghanaian music group that was founded in 1973. Naa was the recipient of the 2018 Vodafone Ghana Music Awards Lifetime Achievement Honors.

Early life 
She joined the choir at St. Georges Garrison Anglican Church, Burma Camp, and later went to Abokobi Presbyterian Mixed-Middle School, where she became the lead singer in the school during the late 1960s.

Performance 
During General Acheampong’s regime in 1974 (operation feed yourself), they toured the country crossing the Volta on the Yaipe Queen to Yaipe and then to Bolgatanga. Taking their music beyond the sores of Ghana, the group traveled to Togo to perform alongside Charlotte Dada, a renowned female Ghanaian musician. They also performed in the USA and the UK.

Naa Amanua later left Wulomei to join the Suku Troupe whose first album, awo de me, was a big hit. The Suku Troupe afforded Naa Amanua the opportunity to give the world a little more than just music. They were a force to reckon with in the theatre and dance arenas, too. In 1978, they toured Benin, Togo and Liberia in West Africa and visited Kenya, where they performed for President Jomo Kenyatta.

After a decade with Suku Troupe, Naa Amanua left to form her own group in 1988 and released Mi yen Maya in 1989.

Naa remains active. She performs at events and special occasions and stole the show alongside the Burgher Highlife musician, Charles Amoah, at the 18th edition of the Vodafone Ghana Music Awards.

In 2018, the Ga-Adangme Concern Youth Group under the leadership of Nii Ayaafio Tetteh recognized and awarded her with the Ga title "Nye Kpakpa" for her contribution to Ga-Adangme music from the grass roots. Naa believes that a gift from God is everlasting.

References

External 
 Naa Amanua of Wulomei performance at Vodafone Ghana Music Awards 2017

Living people
Ghanaian women musicians
Year of birth missing (living people)